Macropus titan is an extinct species of kangaroo (a marsupial) that lived during the Pleistocene. The species was most similar to the extant kangaroo species Macropus giganteus, the eastern grey kangaroo. Some doubt exists as to whether Macropus titan constitutes a separate species to the eastern grey kangaroo, as the two are extremely similar, M. titan differing consistently only in its greater size.

References

External links
Mikko's Phylogeny archive

Prehistoric macropods
Pleistocene mammals of Australia
Pleistocene marsupials
Mammals described in 1838